Paranjoy Guha Thakurta (born 5 October 1955) is an Indian journalist, writer, publisher, documentary film maker and teacher. He has been a guest faculty member at IIM Ahmedabad for 18 consecutive years, and also taught at the IIMs at Calcutta and Shillong, the University of Delhi, Jawaharlal Nehru University, Asian College of Journalism and Jamia Millia Islamia among other educational institutions.

Career
Guha Thakurta was educated at La Martiniere Calcutta, pursued his undergraduate degree in Economics from St. Stephen's College and completed his masters from Delhi School of Economics in 1977. With the Emergency of 1975-77, he decided to be a journalist over being a lecturer. In June 1977, he joined a Kolkata-based magazine as assistant editor. Through his career spanning over 45 years, he has been associated with major media houses like Business India, Businessworld, The Telegraph, India Today and The Pioneer. He also hosted the chat show India Talks on CNBC-India which ran over 1400 episodes.

In 2013, he directed a short documentary film Coal Curse which highlighted the wrongs in the Indian coal mining industry. The 45-minute film, supported by Greenpeace, delved into the political economy of coal in contemporary India with the Singrauli example serving as a case study. This was Guha Thakurta's second film on coal, the earlier one being 'Hot as hell: Why Jharia is burning', that was produced  in 2006 by the Public Service Broadcasting Trust.

His 2014 book Gas Wars: Crony Capitalism and the Ambanis, co-authored with Subir Ghosh and Jyotirmoy Chaudhuri, dealt with alleged irregularities of the prices of natural gas in the Indian market. Reliance Industries Limited, one of India's major conglomerates which is also involved in oil and gas exploration and production, sent a legal notice to Guha Thakurta and others for defamation through this book.

In 2016, he joined EPW (Economic and Political Weekly) as Editor. Following his article on how Adani Group was benefited by the government policies, a defamation notice was sent to the Sameeksha Trust and the authors of the article. Soon after that, Guha Thakurta resigned as the Editor of EPW. The article brought to light how the Government tweaked the rules which favoured a certain company within the Adani Group to the tune of Rs 500 Crores. EPW tried to reach out to Ministry of Finance and Ministry of Industry and Commerce, but no explanation was given for this policy decision. The Adani Group is headed by Gautam Adani who is understood to be close to Prime Minister Narendra Modi.

Guha Thakurta was appointed Editor of the Economic and Political Weekly (EPW) in January 2016 replacing C Rammanohar Reddy, who steered the prestigious journal since 2004. Guha Thakurta resigned as editor of EPW on July 18, 2017 over alleged differences with the board of the Sameeksha Trust that runs the journal.

Guha Thakurta co-authored an article  about the Adani Group's tax evasion following which Adani Power sent a legal notice to the Economic and Political Weekly. Fearing an expensive lawsuit by one of India’s biggest corporate houses EPW then decided to take down the article, prompting Paranjoy Guha Thakurta's resignation.

Paid news 
Guha Thakurta was a member of the sub-committee set up by the Press Council of India to look into the malaise of paid news. Initially, the report titled '‘Paid News: How Corruption in the Indian Media Undermines Democracy" was to be released on 26 April 2010, but it was deferred after many members of the Council raised objections. A diluted version of the report, which was released on 30 July 2010, raised a storm. A number of newspaper establishments were named as having indulged in editorial malpractices. These included Bennett, Coleman and Co (owners of The Times of India), HT Media (owners of Hindustan Times, Hindustan and Mint), Dainik Jagaran, Dainik Bhaskar, Punjab Kesari, Lokmat, Eenadu, and Sakshi group, among others.

In September 2010, the Central Information Commission (CIC)  of India directed the Council to make public the report as part of suo motu disclosure mandated under the Right to Information (RTI) Act.

Guha Thakurta has since written extensively on the issue of "paid news". In a December 2013 article for First Post, he explained why the malaise of "paid news" is a threat to democracy:

PIL on 2G case 
Guha Thakurta was one of many well-known people who joined a public interest litigation in the 2G spectrum case, originally filed by the Centre for Public Interest Litigation (CPIL) led by lawyer Prashant Bhushan. He has written extensively on the scam, with the first article on the subject appearing in The Economic Times in November 2007. Soon after its publication, a legal notice was served on him by Reliance Communications.

Works

Books
 A Time of Coalitions: Divided We Stand, 2004 SAGE; co-author Shankar Raghuraman, .
 Media Ethics, 2009 Oxford University Press, .
 Gas Wars: Crony Capitalism and the Ambanis, 2014 Paranjoy Guha Thakurta; co-authors Subir Ghosh and Jyotirmoy Chaudhuri, .
 Sue the Messenger: How legal arm-twisting by corporates is shackling reportage and undermining democracy in India; co-author with Subir Ghosh; 2016 Paranjoy and Authors UpFront, .
 Thin Dividing Line: India, Mauritius and Global Illicit financial flows; co-authored with Shinzani Jain; 2017 Penguin Random House India, .
 Loose Pages:Court Cases That Could Have Shaken India, co-author Sourya Majumder, .
 The Real Face of Facebook in India: How Social Media have Become a Weapon and Disseminator of Disinformation and Falsehood, 2019 Paranjoy Guha Thakurta; co-author Cyril Sam, 
 A Million Mission: Non Profit Sector in India, 2014 Paranjoy; Author Mathew Cherian,  
 Calcutta Diary, 2014 Paranjoy; Author Ashok Mitra, 
 The Modi Myth, 2015 Paranjoy; Author S. Nihal Singh, 
 Netaji: Living Dangerously, 2015 Paranjoy; Author Kingshuk Nag, 
 Idea of India Hard To Beat: Republic Resilient, 2016 Paranjoy; Author Badri Raina, 
 First Person Singular, 2016 Paranjoy; Author Ashok Mitra, 
 Encounters, 2016 Paranjoy; Author Ramnika Gupta, 
 Junkland Journeys: The witty story of how world is won by a whacky addict who discovers god in a dog, 2016 Paranjoy; Author Ajith Pillai, 
 Edward John Thompson: British Liberalism and the Limits of Rapprochement, 2016 Paranjoy; Author Shashi Raina, 
 The Story of Secularism: 15th-21st Century, 2016 Paranjoy; Author Nalini Rajan, 
 Kashmir: A Noble Tryst in Tatters, 2017 Paranjoy; Author Badri Raina, 
 Chasing His Father's Dreams: Inside Story of Odisha's Longest Serving Chief Minister, 2017 Paranjoy; Author Biswajit Mohanty, 
 The Russian Revolution: And Storms Across A Century (1917-2017), 2017 Paranjoy; Author, Achala Moulik, 
 Alternative Futures: India Unshackled, 2017 AuthorsUpFront Paranjoy; Authors Ashish Kothari and K.J. Roy, 
 Grand Illusion: The GSPC Disaster and the Gujarat Model, 2017 Paranjoy; Author Subir Ghosh, 
 Corruption, CBI and I: More than Memories of a Veteran Scam-Buster, 2020 Paranjoy; Authors Shantonu Sen and Sanjukta Basu, 
 India's Long Walk Home, 2020 Paranjoy; Authors Ishan Chauhan and Zenaida Cubbinz, 
 India: The Wasted Years, 2021 Paranjoy; Author Avay Shukla, 
 Electoral Democrary? An Inquiry into the Fairness and Integrity of Elections in India, 2022 Paranjoy; Edited by M.G. Devasahayam,

Documentaries
 Idiot Box or Window of Hope, 2003
 Hot As Hell: A Profile of Dhanbad, 2006
 Grabbing Eyeballs: What’s Unethical About Television News in India, 2007
 Advertorial: Selling News or Products?, 2009
 So Near Yet So Far, 2009
 Blood & Iron: A Story of the Convergence of Crime, Business and Politics in Southern India, 2010-11
 The Great Indian Telecom Robbery, 2011
 Freedom Song, 2012
 Children In Crossfire, 2013
 A Thin Dividing Line, 2014
 Coal Curse, 2013
 In the Heart of Our Darkness: The Life and Death of Mahendra Karma, 2013
 Inferno: Jharkhand's Underground Fires, 2015
 Even it Up, 2015
 Farzi:Vypam Ka Vyapaar, 2018
 Unfair,2019
 India's Children: Gorakhpur's Broken Public Health, 2019
 Anand Vihar: Workers on the Longest Walk of their Lives, 2020
 Migrant Workers: Stranded and Scared, 2020
 What Bengal Thinks Today, 2021
 Anjan Ghosh Tribute, 2021

Music Videos 

 Dike Dike Hao Hushiar, 2021 (Producer and Director), Featuring The Fiddler's Green
 Dharti Tumhari, Dharti Hamari, 2021 (Producer and Director), Featuring Deepak Castelino

References

External links
 Personal website
 Hot as hell on Culture Unplugged
 Books on Amazon

Delhi School of Economics alumni
Indian male television journalists
Indian documentary filmmakers
Indian newspaper editors
Indian political writers
Indian publishers (people)
Living people
1955 births
20th-century Bengalis
Bengali film directors
Bengali writers
Bengali Hindus
Journalists from West Bengal
Indian journalists
Indian male journalists
20th-century Indian journalists
21st-century Indian journalists
English-language writers from India
Indian film directors
21st-century Indian film directors
Film directors from West Bengal
Indian newspaper journalists
Indian academics
Indian book publishers (people)
Indian music video directors
Indian scholars
21st-century Indian scholars
Indian environmental writers
Indian political scientists
Indian social sciences writers
Indian sociologists
Indian economics writers
Indian non-fiction environmental writers
Indian economists
20th-century Indian economists
21st-century Indian economists
Indian social scientists
20th-century Indian social scientists
21st-century Indian social scientists
Indian development economists
Indian development specialists
Indian male writers
21st-century Indian writers
Indian non-fiction writers
Indian male non-fiction writers
21st-century Indian non-fiction writers